Manú District is one of four districts of Manú Province in Peru.

References